This is a list of the squads picked for the 2014 ICC Under-19 Cricket World Cup.

Group A

Coach:  Bharat Arun

Source - ESPN Cricinfo

Coach:

Coach:

Coach:

Group B

Coach:

Coach:

Coach:

Coach:

Group C

Coach:  Ray Jennings

Coach:

Coach:

Coach:

Group D

Coach: Grant Bradburn

Coach:

Coach:

Coach:

References and notes

ICC Under-19 Cricket World Cup squads
2014 in cricket
2014 ICC Under-19 Cricket World Cup